South Broken Hill Football Club is an Australian rules football based in Broken Hill in New South Wales, Australia. The club competes in the Broken Hill Football League.

Notable players
Lindsay Beck (Port Adelaide, Glenelg, Hawthorn)
Chris Duthy (Glenelg, Fitzroy)
Russell Ellen (Essendon, West Perth)
Tom Everuss (Hawthorn)
Jack Gaffney (Fitzroy)
Stewart Geddes (Melbourne, St Kilda, West Torrens)
Jack Hanson (Footscray)
Steve Hywood (Richmond, Glenelg)
Walter Minogue (Footscray)
Harold Oliver (Port Adelaide)
Ron Serich (Richmond)
James Tierney (West Adelaide, West Torrens, South Adelaide, North Adelaide)

References

Australian rules football clubs in New South Wales
Australian rules football clubs established in 1900
1900 establishments in Australia
Sport in Broken Hill, New South Wales